eKuPhakameni is a small town in KwaZulu-Natal, South Africa that was set out by one of the largest African Christian sects, the Nazareth Baptist Church. INkosi Isaiah Shembe, who founded the sect in 1911, bought land in the Inanda area for his church and called the town eKuPhakameni (place of spiritual uplift). Shembe who died in 1935 is buried at eKuPhakameni and the grave is regarded as a shrine. Large festivals are held here in January, April, July and September every year.

Populated places in eThekwini Metropolitan Municipality